Tell Ayoub is an archaeological site 2km north of Bar Elias in the Beqaa Mohafazat (Governorate). It dates at least to the Neolithic.

References

Baalbek District
Neolithic settlements
Archaeological sites in Lebanon
Great Rift Valley